Miles de Noyers (1271 – 21 September 1350) was a French diplomat.

References 

1271 births
1350 deaths
French diplomats
Marshals of France
Medieval French diplomats
14th-century French people
14th-century diplomats